Cristian Dell'Orco (born 10 February 1994) is an Italian professional footballer who plays for Perugia, as a defender.

Career
Born in Sant'Angelo Lodigiano, Lombardy region , Dell'Orco started his senior career at Serie D club Fiorenzuola, in Emilia region. In the 2012–13 season, he returned to youth football for Parma's reserve team. On 30 June 2013, Dell'Orco was signed by FeralpiSalò on a temporary deal. On 20 June 2014, he was signed by Ascoli on another temporary deal. During that season, he helped his side to promotion to Serie B. He had a contract with Parma which would last until 30 June 2019. However, he became a free agent on 25 June 2015, after the bankruptcy of Parma.

On 28 July 2015, Dell'Orco was signed by Sassuolo on a free transfer on a five-year contract. He wore no.39 shirt for the team. On 31 August he was signed by Serie B club Novara in a temporary deal.

On 31 January 2019, Dell'Orco joined Empoli on loan until 30 June 2019.

On 9 August 2019, he joined Serie A club Lecce on loan with an option to buy.

On 11 September 2020, Dell'Orco joined Spezia on loan until 30 June 2021.

On 16 July 2021 he moved to Perugia on a three-year contract.

Honors
Ascoli
 Serie C: 2014-15 Group B

References

External links
 
 

Living people
1994 births
Association football defenders
Italian footballers
Italy youth international footballers
U.S. Fiorenzuola 1922 S.S. players
Parma Calcio 1913 players
FeralpiSalò players
Ascoli Calcio 1898 F.C. players
U.S. Sassuolo Calcio players
Novara F.C. players
Empoli F.C. players
U.S. Lecce players
Spezia Calcio players
A.C. Perugia Calcio players
Serie A players
Serie B players
Serie C players
Serie D players